Alaba incerta is a species of sea snail, a marine gastropod mollusk in the family Litiopidae.

Distribution
This species occurs in the Caribbean Sea and off the Lesser Antilles.

Description 
The maximum recorded shell length is 10 mm.

Habitat 
Minimum recorded depth is 0 m. Maximum recorded depth is 40 m.

References

 Rosenberg, G., F. Moretzsohn, and E. F. García. 2009. Gastropoda (Mollusca) of the Gulf of Mexico, Pp. 579–699 in Felder, D.L. and D.K. Camp (eds.), Gulf of Mexico–Origins, Waters, and Biota. Biodiversity. Texas A&M Press, College Station, Texas.

External links

Litiopidae
Gastropods described in 1841